Picramniaceae is a small, mainly neotropical family of four genera Aenigmanu, Alvaradoa, Nothotalisia and Picramnia. The family is the only member of the order Picramniales. Members of the family were formerly placed in the family Simaroubaceae or misidentified as species in the family Sapindaceae, in the order Sapindales. The most recent standard classification of the Angiosperms (the APG III system) distinguishes it as a separate family and order. It belongs to the malvids (eurosids II), one of the three groups that constitute the rosids.

In 2021, a new genus was identified from materials collected almost 50 years prior. It was discovered by Robert Foster in 1973, but no scientist was able to identify it. It is named Aenigmanu for the enigma it originally presented to researchers.

 Family Picramniaceae
 Genus Aenigmanu
 Genus Alvaradoa
 Genus Nothotalisia
 Genus Picramnia

Characteristics 
The occurrence of tariric acid as the major fatty acid is typical for the Picramniaceae.

References

External links
 Picramniales (at Angiosperm Phylogeny Website)
  (“Mystery plant” from the Amazon declared a new species after nearly 50 years of flummoxing scientists)

Rosid families